The European Journal of Oncology Nursing is a peer-reviewed medical journal covering cancer research of direct relevance to patient care, nurse education, management, and policy development. It is published by Elsevier. The journal was established in 1997, with Alison Richardson as its founding editor-in-chief. It is the official journal of the European Oncology Nursing Society and its current editor-in-chief is Alex Molassiotis (Hong Kong Polytechnic University).

Abstracting and indexing 
The journal is abstracted and indexed in:

According to the Journal Citation Reports, the journal has a 2018 impact factor of 1.697.

References

External links

Oncology nursing journals
Elsevier academic journals
English-language journals
Publications established in 1997
Bimonthly journals